Gary Alan Sargent (born February 18, 1954) is an American former professional ice hockey defenseman who played 402 games in the National Hockey League with the Los Angeles Kings and Minnesota North Stars between 1975 and 1983. Internationally he played for the American national team at the 1976 Canada Cup. A first team all-star and league MVP at Bemidji State University, his professional hockey career was cut short by injuries.

Early life
A member of the Ojibwa (Chippewa) nation, he was born on a reservation. Sargent was also a highly promising high school baseball and gridiron football player, receiving an offer to sign a professional contract with the Major League Baseball Minnesota Twins as well as several college football scholarship offers. However, Sargent decided to pursue a career in hockey instead; his distant cousin Henry Boucha and later his first cousin T. J. Oshie also played in the NHL, while his younger brother Earl Sargent is a former NHL draft choice who played minor league hockey.

Pro career
Sargent was drafted by the Los Angeles Kings with the 48th pick in the 1974 NHL Entry Draft and joined the Kings in 1975 after excelling for the United States national hockey team in the 1973 Ice Hockey World Championship and 1974 World Junior Ice Hockey Championships tournament, where he was voted most valuable defenseman. He was named the Kings outstanding newcomer after his rookie year. He was also a member of the US team at the inaugural 1976 Canada Cup tournament and was voted the Kings defenseman of the year in 1976-77. In the 1977–78 season, Sargent tallied 54 points, had a plus/minus of plus 18 on a team that was minus 2 for the season. However, the Kings failed to re-sign Sargent and he became a free agent.

In the summer of 1978, Sargent signed with his native Minnesota North Stars as a restricted free agent when his contract with the Kings ended. Minnesota had to give up three players to Los Angeles (Rick Hampton, Steve Jensen and Dave Gardner) as compensation, but Sargent quickly became one of his new team's most important defensemen in 1978–79, being on ice for a league-record 53.1 percent of his team's goals that season. Sargent was selected for the 1980 NHL All Star game (in Los Angeles) but was unable to participate due to persistent back and knee problems which eventually forced him to retire prematurely in 1983 after missing most of the previous three seasons.

Post career
Sargent returned to the Los Angeles Kings after retiring as a player. He worked as a talent scout for them in 1986–1988.

Career statistics

Regular season and playoffs

International

References

External links
 
 Sargent's player profile at HockeyDraftCentral.com

1954 births
Living people
American men's ice hockey defensemen
Bemidji State Beavers men's ice hockey players
Ice hockey players from Minnesota
Indianapolis Racers draft picks
Los Angeles Kings scouts
Los Angeles Kings draft picks
Los Angeles Kings players
Minnesota North Stars players
Native American sportspeople
People from Bemidji, Minnesota
People from Red Lake, Minnesota
Springfield Indians players